Randall Edwards may refer to:
 Randall Edwards (actress) (born 1955), American television actress
 Randall Edwards (politician) (born 1961), American politician